KVCU AM 1190, branded Radio 1190, is a college radio station affiliated with the University of Colorado Boulder. Operated by CU since 1998, the station broadcasts from studios in the basement of the University Memorial Center on the CU campus.

History

As a commercial station
The Brocade Broadcasting Company (later changed to Brokade Broadcasting), owned by Enid C. Pepperd and Dona B. West, obtained a construction permit from the FCC for a new daytime-only radio station in Boulder on November 6, 1972, nearly four years after filing for the station in February 1969. The station signed on November 1, with middle of the road music and news programming. The format was short-lived, the station lost money, and the owners wanted out; a sales manager, Dan Skibitsky, persuaded Brokade to change the format to progressive rock. Though the format flip brought more interest, a sale was still in the cards. Two years after launching, Brocade sold the station to the Greenlee and Gawne families, trading as Centennial Wireless, for $220,000. In 1979, the station was granted approval to increase power to 5,000 watts. Two years later, the Greenlees then acquired KRNW (97.3 FM), which they relaunched as freeform rocker and adult album alternative format pioneer KBCO.

KADE became KBCO in 1985, and two years later, the Greenlees sold the pair to Noble Broadcast Group in a $27.25 million transaction. Up until then a low-rated simulcast of the FM, the station changed to talk in 1995 as "KHOW2", a brand extension of co-owned KHOW (630 AM). Noble owned the stations until it was purchased by Jacor in 1996.

Donation to CU
In mid-1997, Jacor offered the 1190 AM facility to the University of Colorado—as a donation. CU had not owned a broadcast station in nearly 75 years; from 1922 to 1925, the university had operated KFAJ, which conducted experiments and supported instruction in radio communications, but which was unlistenable at any time KOA was broadcasting and was thus closed. At the time, the university's carrier-current station could not even be heard in all campus dormitories. Jacor had good reason to make the donation: it needed to divest a station if it wanted to acquire KTCL in Fort Collins, another FM station the company was already programming in the region, as it owned a full complement of eight stations in the Denver market.

The station went off air in January 1998 to prepare for the transfer, and under the new call letters KVCU, it signed on November 4 of the same year. The new outlet aired a combination of student output and programs from volunteer DJs—60 of them by 2001.

For the first time since breaking from its simulcast with KBCO-FM in 1995, 1190 AM's programming began being heard on FM in 2016, when the station debuted on an FM translator (K255DA at 98.9 MHz, now K251CV on 98.1) in Boulder. As of March 2021, K251CV relays the HD3 sub-channel of KQKS.

References

External links

Radio 1190 website
University of Colorado Student Government

VCU
University of Colorado Boulder
VCU
Radio stations established in 1973
1973 establishments in Colorado